Amarapuram is a village in Penukonda revenue division and mandal of Sri Sathya Sai district, Andhra Pradesh.

Geography 
It has an average elevation of 603 metres (1981 ft).

Demographics 
According to Indian census, 2001, the demographic details of Amarapuram mandal is as follows:
 Total Population: 	52,717	in 10,554 Households.
 Male Population: 	26,854	and Female Population: 	25,863
 Children Under 6-years of age: 7,136	(Boys – 3,663 and Girls – 3,473)
 Total Literates: 	23,186

References 

Villages in Sri Sathya Sai district
Mandal headquarters in Sri Sathya Sai district